Mahoning Valley Railway (MVRY) is a short-line railroad in Mahoning County, Ohio, United States, owned by Genesee & Wyoming Inc. It has an interchange with Norfolk Southern Railway at its east end. The west end is Youngstown Belt Railroad which is also owned by Genesee & Wyoming. This services Youngstown, Ohio area for its steel mills. The line connects Struthers, Ohio with Youngstown.

The company was acquired by Genesee & Wyoming in 2008 as part of its purchase of the Ohio Central Railroad System.

In March 2020, MVRY purchased Ohi-Rail Corporation's lines in Eastern Ohio and also took over the lease of the lines which Ohi-Rail used to lease from the State of Ohio, thereby taking over all of Ohi-Rail's freight operations.

References

External links
Mahoning Valley Railway official webpage - Genesee and Wyoming website

Ohio railroads
Genesee & Wyoming
Transportation in Mahoning County, Ohio